Nguyễn Thúc Thùy Tiên (born August 12, 1998) is a Vietnamese beauty queen and model. She was crowned Miss Grand International 2021 in 4th December 2021 at Bangkok, Thailand, is the first Vietnamese woman to win this beauty pageant. Before that, she also represented Vietnam to compete at Miss International 2018 in Japan. She was awarded the Certificate of Merit by the Prime Minister of Vietnam Phạm Minh Chính for Prominent Young Face 2021 (Vietnamese: Gương mặt trẻ tiêu biểu 2021).

Early life and education 
Thùy Tiên was born on August 12, 1998 in Ho Chi Minh City. She once read French Language at the Faculty of French Language of School of Social Sciences and Humanities, Vietnam National University, Ho Chi Minh City before switching to a new major and then obtaining her Bachelor's degree in International Hotel and Restaurant Management (joint program with Vatel) from the Hoa Sen University in 2022.

Pageantry

Miss Southern Region Vietnam 2017 
In 2017, Thùy Tiên participated in the Miss Southern Region Vietnam 2017 contest and won the title of 1st Runner-up.

Miss Vietnam 2018 
Being the runner-up of Miss Southern Region Vietnam, she had the opportunity to compete in Miss Vietnam 2018 and she was selected to the Top 5 along with the Beauty with a Purpose award.

Miss International 2018 
Thùy Tiên was appointed to be the replacement representative at Miss International 2018 held in Japan. However, she did not enter the Top 15.

Miss Grand Vietnam 2021  
Thùy Tiên was appointed as Miss Grand Vietnam 2021 and later participated at Miss Grand International 2021. She was crowned on November 16, 2021.

Miss Grand International 2021 
During the national costume competition, held on November 30, she wore a costume entitled “Blue Angel” by designer Tín Thái, that featured a pair of huge wings with gilded decorations behind, an elaborated headdress, gloves, as well as bulky platform boots with 8-inch heels that reportedly hindered her walk. However, her costume made strong impression and was positively commented, in spite of another mishap that took place towards the end of her performance when her right wing unexpectedly collapsed, leading Thùy Tiên to comment on the incident on her Facebook page: "Thank you so much! There was a little incident with the wings, but I hope everyone will ignore it and support me in the upcoming rounds."

At the preliminary competition, held on December 2, she wore a red dress during the evening gown performance.

On December 4, at the final show, Thùy Tiên was advanced to Top 20. After that, she then wore a blue two-piece bikini at the swimsuit competition that helped her advance to Top 10.

During the English presentation of Miss Grand International 2021, she answered on the topic of world peace. Right after that, she said a sentence in Thai that means "Make the world a better place for everyone", while raising 3 fingers together, a protest symbol greeting, anti-dictatorship inspired by the Hunger Games, is also the salute of pro- democracy protesters in Thailand and Myanmar.

During the Top 10 evening gown performance, she wore a dress called "The Crown Dress". This is also the dress chosen by the beauty in the Miss Grand Vietnam 2021 crowning ceremony.

With that answer and her evening gown performance, once again she advanced to Top 5.

During the Top 5 question and answer round, Thùy Tiên was asked by the host, "There are many problems in the world right now, such as human rights and the economy. Who would you choose and why?" She answered:

After that, with the best interview questions in English and Thai, she won the title and was crowned by Miss Grand International 2020, Abena Appiah.

In her capacity as Miss Grand International 2021, she travelled to Thailand, Peru, Ecuador, Colombia, Spain, Angola,  Romania, United Kingdom, Malaysia, India, Indonesia, and her home country of Vietnam.

Vietnam International Fashion Week 2022 
On May 29, 2022, Thùy Tiên made a guest star appearance in Hoàng Hải's fashion show Bướm hoang/Wild Butterfly (the closing show of the Aquafina Vietnam International Fashion Week Spring/Summer 2022), for which she was the showstopper, dressed in a rhinestone, thigh-high split dress with angel wings. However, her left shoelace came loose and gradually slipped down during her walk, which caused her to trip on the 3D butterfly decorations attached to it and fall on the catwalk. The incident received widespread attention throughout the Vietnamese media, to the point that Thùy Tiên gave her own comments on what exactly happened.

References 

1998 births
Living people
Miss International 2018 delegates
Miss Grand International winners
People from Ho Chi Minh City
Vietnamese beauty pageant winners